Pleiospilos bolusii, the mimicry plant, is a species of flowering plant in the family Aizoaceae, native to the Eastern Cape of South Africa, where it grows at an altitude of . The species epithet bolusii honours Harry Bolus, a 19th-century South African botanist.

The leaves are longer and more angular than those of the closely related P. nelii, but in both cases the shape and texture of the leaves resemble a pile of split pebbles, possibly to deter predators. The flowers are often coconut-scented. The flowering period extends from August to September.

The plant is one of several species cultivated for their rocklike appearance, which are sometimes collectively called mesembs. It has gained the Royal Horticultural Society's Award of Garden Merit.

References

 The plant list
 African Plant Database
 Tropicos

Bibliography
  AFPD. 2008. African Flowering Plants Database - Base de Donnees des Plantes a Fleurs D'Afrique.
  Gibbs Russell, G. E., W. G. Welman, E. Reitief, K. L. Immelman, G. Germishuizen, B. J. Pienaar, M. v. Wyk & A. Nicholas. 1987. List of species of southern African plants. Mem. Bot. Surv. S. Africa 2(1–2): 1–152(pt. 1), 1–270(pt. 2).
  Bot. Jahrb. Syst. 106: 474 (1986).
  II. Handbook succulent plants: Aizoaceae F-Z : 219 (2001

Flora of South Africa
bolusii
Taxa named by N. E. Brown
Taxa named by Joseph Dalton Hooker